On 8 March 1962, a Fairchild F-27 of Turkish Airlines registered as TC-KOP, crashed into Mount Medetsiz while en route from Ankara Esenboğa Airport (ESB/LTAC) to Adana Airport (ADA/LTAF), killing all eight passengers and three crew members on board. The aircraft was descending into Adana when it encountered cumulus clouds, leading the pilots to fly around them and change their altitude accordingly. It is believed that the pilots lost track of their location and altitude while doing so, causing the plane to crash into the bottom of an abyss at the mountain. The location of the wreckage and harsh weather conditions meant that rescue team wasn't able to reach the accident site until 11 March, while local villagers managed to reach it a day prior.

Aircraft and crew 
The aircraft involved in the accident was a Fairchild F-27 registered as TC-KOP with serial number 83. The aircraft had made its first flight in 1960 and had a valid airworthiness certificate.

The captain and pilot in command of the flight was Nejat Aksan, while the co-pilot was Zülfikar Kaya. Emel Kiper was the sole cabin crew member on board. According to the final report, the crew was "properly licensed."

Accident 
The aircraft took off from Istanbul Yeşilköy Airport (ISL/LTBA) with the same crew and landed at Ankara Esenboğa Airport (ESB/LTAC). The flight took off from Ankara at 16:28 local time without taking any new passengers and headed to Adana Airport (ADA/LTAF) as a scheduled domestic flight. The estimated arrival time was 17:40. At 17:28, the pilots reported that they were at flight level 175 and requested clearance to approach. They also told that they were flying around cumulus clouds and changing their altitude accordingly to avoid turbulence. No further communication was received from the aircraft.

The aircraft crashed at 15:43 local time at  AMSL into Mount Medetsiz,  from the Adana radio range. The aircraft split into three main pieces upon impact.

Victims and recovery 

There were three crew members and eight passengers on board the airplane. Two of the passengers were from the United States. The wreckage of the aircraft was at the bottom of an abyss. The recovery team initially had difficulties with reaching the accident site due to strong winds and snow. Local villagers first reached the crash site on 10 March.

After spending the night in a nearby village, a team of Turkish, American and British experts, with the help of local villagers, started to walk the last  left to reach the wreckage at 5am on 11 March. They reached the aircraft six hours later. The bodies were torn in pieces and had burns, making identification impossible. Six bodies were taken out of the plane on 12 March, followed by three more on the next day.

Reincarnation theory 
One of the passengers on the flight was Ahmet Delibalta, who was returning to Adana after searching for a female singer for his nightclub. Five days after the crash on 13 March, a boy named Erkan Kılıç was born in Adana. According to a book published by professor Ian Stevenson of the University of Virginia, Kılıç was afraid of seeing and hearing airplanes until the age of three. Stevenson claimed that soon after gaining ability to speak, Kılıç said that he was Delibalta, died in a plane crash and that he survived the initial impact, but later froze to death. He was able to correctly identify Delibalta's family members from photographs. Kılıç also identified Rengin Arda, the singer who was coming back to Adana with him and died in the accident.

Cause 
The two-page long final report was translated to English and released by the International Civil Aviation Organization (ICAO) in 1966. The report was only based on the initial findings made by the investigators, without discussion of evidence or analysis of the wreckage. The probable cause of the accident according to this report was:

This explanation was re-affirmed in 1975, when Gündüz Sevilgen, a member of the 15th Parliament of Turkey from the National Salvation Party, wrote several questions to the Grand National Assembly of Turkey related to Turkish Airlines, including the causes of accidents. He received a response from the Minister of Transport, Sabahattin Özbek, on 18 March. The response included a short list of causes of all Turkish Airlines crashes to date. The cause for the Tarsus crash in the response was:

References

Citations

Bibliography

External links 
 

Aviation accidents and incidents in 1962
Aviation accidents and incidents in Turkey
Turkish Airlines accidents and incidents
Turkish Airlines 1962 Taurus Mauntains
Turkish Airlines 1962
History of Adana Province
Turkish Airlines Taurus Mountains 1962
March 1962 events in Europe
1962 disasters in Turkey